Camp General Vicente Lukban (CGVL) is the military headquarters of the Armed Forces of the Philippines (AFP) and is located in the city of Catbalogan in the Philippines. It is located along Pan-Philippine Highway in Brgy Maulong. The military base is named after the Filipino Military General, Vicente Lukbán, a Filipino officer in Emilio Aguinaldo's staff during the Philippine Revolution and the politico-military chief of Samar and Leyte during the Philippine–American War.

History
Camp Lukban was established on August 1, 1988 to serve as the headquarters of the 8th Infantry Division of the Philippine Army is a known officially as the Stormtroopers Division.

See also
Military history of the Philippines
Military history of the Philippines during World War II
Philippine Army
Philippine Air Force
Philippine Navy and Philippine Marine Corps

References

External links
Armed Forces of the Philippines

Lukban
Buildings and structures in Catbalogan